Iredalula is a genus of sea snails, marine gastropod mollusks in the family Colubrariidae.

Species
Species within the genus Iredalula include:
 Iredalula alticincta (Murdoch & Suter, 1906)
 Iredalula groschi Fraussen & Monsecour, 2007
  † Iredalula striata (Hutton, 1873)
Species brought into synonymy
 Iredalula venusta Powell, 1934 : synonym of Iredalula alticincta (Murdoch & Suter, 1906)

References

External links
  Henry Suter (1913): Manual of the New Zealand Mollusca; Government of New Zealand, Wellington, N.Z.

Buccinulidae